Sunil Subasiri Abeysundara (born  15 April 1927) was a Sri Lankan politician. He was the Deputy Minister of Fisheries and member of Parliament of Sri Lanka from Yatinuwara representing the United National Party. 

He was elected to parliament from Yatinuwara in the March 1960 general election defeating Hector Kobbekaduwa (future presidential candidate) and D.B. Wijetunga (future President of Sri Lanka), but lost his seat to in the July 1960 general election to U. B. Weerasekera. He was elected again in the 1965 general election defeating Weerasekera. He then lost the 1970 general election to Hector Kobbekaduwa and was able to defeat Kobbekaduwa in the 1977 general election and was appointed Deputy Minister of Fisheries.

References

1927 births
Year of death missing
Deputy ministers of Sri Lanka
Members of the 4th Parliament of Ceylon
Members of the 6th Parliament of Ceylon
Members of the 8th Parliament of Sri Lanka
United National Party politicians